Paris Games Week, or simply PGW, is a trade fair for video games held annually at the Paris Expo Porte de Versailles in Paris, France. It is organised by SELL (Syndicat des éditeurs de logiciels de loisirs), a French organisation that promotes the interests of video game developers.

Dates

2020 event and COVID-19 pandemic
Paris Games Week 2020 was going to be held from 23 to 27 October but due to the COVID-19 pandemic in France, the physical event was cancelled.

References

External links 

  

2010 establishments in France
Annual events in Paris
Events in Paris
Recurring events established in 2010
Trade fairs in France
Video game trade shows
Video gaming in France
Tourist attractions in Paris